Mopsechiniscus is a genus of terrestrial tardigrades in the family Echiniscidae. It was named and described by Eveline Du Bois-Reymond Marcus in 1944.

Species
The genus includes the following species:
 Mopsechiniscus franciscae Guidetti, Rebecchi, Cesari & McInnes, 2014
 Mopsechiniscus frenoti Dastych, 1999
 Mopsechiniscus granulosus Mihelčič, 1967
 Mopsechiniscus imberbis (Richters, 1907)
 Mopsechiniscus schusteri Dastych, 1999 
 Mopsechiniscus tasmanicus Dastych & Moscal, 1992

References

Further reading

 Du Bois-Reymond Marcus, 1944 : Sobre tardigrados Brasileiros. (On Brazilian Tardigrades) Comunicaciones Zoologicas del Museo de Historia Natural de Montevideo, vol. 1, p. 1-19.
 Nomenclator Zoologicus info

Echiniscidae
Tardigrade genera
Taxa named by Eveline Du Bois-Reymond Marcus